Eprinomectin is an avermectin used as a veterinary topical endectocide. It is a mixture of two chemical compounds, eprinomectin B1a and B1b.

References

Antiparasitic agents
Macrocycles
Veterinary medicine